Diamond Trail is a 1933 American Pre-Code film directed by Harry L. Fraser.

Rex Bell portrays a "wise-cracking reporter-detective", similar to his role in From Broadway to Cheyenne, as he solves a case involving jewel thieves. Opening in a city setting, the film shifts to Nevada as Bell's character works to solve the case. Frances Rich makes her film debut.

Cast
Rex Bell as "Speed" Morgan, posing as Frisco Eddie
Frances Rich as Lois Miller
Lloyd Whitlock as 'Flash' Barrett
Bud Osborne as Bill Miller
Jerome Storm as a Barrett henchman
John Webb Dillon as a Barrett henchman
Billy West as Barrett's henchman "Mac"

References

External links

1933 films
1933 Western (genre) films
1930s English-language films
Monogram Pictures films
American black-and-white films
American Western (genre) films
Films with screenplays by Harry L. Fraser
Films directed by Harry L. Fraser
1930s American films